Ingyaw is a river village in Kale Township, Kale District, in the Sagaing Region of western Burma. It is located to the east of  the town of Kalaymyo.

References

External links
Maplandia World Gazetteer

Populated places in Kale District
Kale Township